The Portland Pride are a defunct indoor soccer team that played in the Continental Indoor Soccer League (CISL) from 1993 to 1997.

History
In 1993, a new league, the Continental Indoor Soccer League (CISL) began its first season.  Traditionally, indoor soccer has been a winter sport, but the CISL decided to play a summer season.  This would keep it from competing with the more established National Professional Soccer League.

The Portland Pride was a founding member of the CISL, being established on October 1, 1992.  Owned by Brian Parrott, the team played its home games in Portland, Oregon’s Memorial Coliseum.  In 1995, Parrott sold the team to a group led by Norm Daniels.

In 1997, the team and the league played its last season.  At the end of the season, the CISL folded and the Pride ownership moved the team to the Premier Soccer Alliance where the team played under the name Portland Pythons.

Coach
 John Bain 1993–1996
 Ian Fulton 1997

Year-by-year

Honors
First Team All Star
 1995 Jeff Betts

External links
 Profile

Defunct indoor soccer clubs in the United States
Continental Indoor Soccer League teams
Defunct soccer clubs in Oregon
Soccer clubs in Oregon
1993 establishments in Oregon
1997 disestablishments in Oregon
Pride
Association football clubs established in 1993
Association football clubs disestablished in 1997